Sammy Johns is the first studio album by singer and songwriter Sammy Johns.  The album featured Johns' most successful single, "Chevy Van," which did not become a hit until two years after this album's release.

In 1996, Sammy Kershaw did a cover of "Chevy Van" on his album Politics, Religion and Her.

Track listing

Personnel 
Lead Vocals, Acoustic Guitar: Sammy Johns
Drums and Percussion: Jim Gordon
Bass: Larry Knechtel, Chuck Rainey
Guitars: James Dutton, Art Munson, Deon Parks, Larry Knechtel 
Pedal Steel Guitars: Buddy Emmons
Keyboards: Larry Knechtel, Mike Melvoin
Background Vocals: Lamont Meredith, The Blackberries, Herb Pedersen
Horns: Chuck Findley.

Charts

Singles

References 

1973 albums